The public relations officer (PRO) or chief communications officer (CCO) or corporate communications officer is a C-suite level officer responsible for communications, public relations, and/or public affairs in an organization. Typically, the CCO of a corporation reports to the chief executive officer (CEO). The CCO may hold an academic degree in communications. A Public Relations Officer has a positive public opinion of an organization and increased brand knowledge as their first concern. They access and monitor their client's online presence to prepare the right message to convey. They can also coach clients on the importance of self-image and how to communicate with the media. A Public Relations Officer aims to positively handle and communicate information internally and externally.

Role 
The CCO of a company is the corporate officer primarily responsible for managing the communications risks and opportunities of a business, both internally and externally. This executive is typically responsible for communications to a wide range of stakeholders, including employees, shareholders, media, bloggers, influential members of the business community, the press, the community and the public. Typically, the CCO may partner with others in the organization to communicate with investors, analysts, customers and company Board members. Most organizations will rely on the CCO to advise and participate in decisions that may impact the ongoing reputation of the firm.

The Chief Communications Officer role is further defined by the Arthur Page Society. This study indicates the importance in the role especially as a key advisor to the CEO. In addition to the Chief Communications Officer title, comparable titles include Vice President of Corporate Communications, Vice President of Public Affairs or Public Information Officer in governmental organizations.

Qualifications
Qualifications for a CCO typically include communications experience with multiple stakeholder groups. Early experience may include journalism, work in a public relations agency or an MBA-type background in strategy or business development. In many cases, the CCO will need to assume responsibility for plans and outcomes that are the result of actions by persons throughout the organization. Korn/Ferry’s Corporate Affairs Center of Expertise conducted a study of CCOs at 67 Fortune 200 companies in order to develop a current profile of the individuals who run the communications function at major global organizations. The survey reviewed how these executives are compensated, the size and scope of their responsibility and where they reside organizationally.

Related articles 
 Communications manager
 Master of Corporate Communication
 Organizational communication

References

Further reading
Korn/Ferry Study (2009)

Management occupations
R